Johann IV may refer to:

 Johann IV, Duke of Bavaria (1437–1463)
 Johann IV von Isenburg (died 1556)
 Johann IV, Count of Katzenelnbogen (died 1444)
 Johann IV von Schweidnitz (1375–1451), bishop of Meissen
 Johann IV Ludwig von Hagen (1492–1547)
 Johann IV Roth (died 1506), bishop of Wrocław
 Yohannes IV of Ethiopia (1837–1889)

See also
 John IV (disambiguation)